The robust blind snake (Anilios ligatus) is a species of snake in the Typhlopidae family.

References

Anilios
Reptiles described in 1879
Taxa named by Wilhelm Peters
Snakes of Australia